Canada competed at the inaugural 1976 Winter Paralympics in Örnsköldsvik, Sweden, 21 to 28 February 1976. Canada sent a team of six athletes (five men and one woman) in both sporting events: alpine skiing and cross-country skiing.

Medalists

Alpine skiing

Men

Women

Cross-country skiing

Men

Women

See also
Canada at the 1976 Winter Olympics
Canada at the Paralympics

References

External links
Canadian Paralympic Committee official website
International Paralympic Committee official website

Nations at the 1976 Winter Paralympics
1976
Paralympics